The X Factor is a British television music competition that first aired in 2004. As of December 2017, there have been fourteen completed series. The final round of the competition features a number of solo singers or vocal groups: nine in series 1, twelve in series 2-6 and 10, 16 in series 7, 8, 11 14, and 15, and 13 in series 9, 12 and 13. A total of 184 acts have reached the finals of their series.

During the first three series, the finalists were split into three groups: "16-24s", "25-and-overs" (renamed "over 25s" in series 2, though still often referred to as "25-and-overs" in series 2 and 3) and "groups". Each set of contestants was mentored by one of the show's judges, Simon Cowell (head judge), Sharon Osbourne and Louis Walsh. From series 4 onwards, the 16-24s were subdivided into boys and girls categories as a fourth judge, Dannii Minogue, joined the show, making four categories in total (Boys, Girls, Over 25s, Groups). Following Osbourne's exit from the show after series 4, Cheryl replaced her. In series 7, the over 25s were changed to over 28s, before being changed back to over 25s for series 8. Also in series 8, Cowell, Minogue and Cheryl all left the show, leaving Walsh as the only judge to return from the previous year. He was joined on the panel by Gary Barlow (head judge), Kelly Rowland and Tulisa. For series 9, Rowland left the show and Nicole Scherzinger joined the panel as her replacement. The over 25s were changed to over 28s again in series 9, and then back to over 25s in series 10. Osbourne also returned to the panel in series 10, replacing Tulisa. The over 25s were changed to over 26s in series 11. Cowell and Cheryl returned for series 11, replacing Barlow and Osbourne. Mel B joined the panel in series 11, replacing Scherzinger. Rita Ora and Nick Grimshaw joined the panel in series 12, replacing Mel B and Walsh. The over 26s were changed to over 27s in series 12, and then back to over 25s in series 13. Walsh, Scherzinger and Osbourne returned to the panel in series 13, replacing Grimshaw, Ora and Cheryl. The over 25s were changed to over 28s in series 14, and then to over 29s in series 15. Only Cowell returned to the panel for series 15, where was he was joined by Robbie Williams, Ayda Field and Louis Tomlinson, who replaced Walsh, Osbourne and Scherzinger, respectively.

As of series 14, all five categories have won the show on at least one occasion, while seven of the show's nine judges have had the winning act in their category at least once, with Cowell winning four times, Cheryl, Minogue and Scherzinger winning twice, and Walsh, Tulisa, Osbourne, Ora and Tomlinson winning once. The only judges not to win were Rowland, Barlow, Mel B, Grimshaw, Field and Williams, with Field and Williams' best performance being sixth place and fourth place respectively in 2018 (their only series), Rowland, Mel B and Grimshaw's best performance being third place in 2011, 2014 and 2015 respectively (their only series) and Barlow placing second in 2011 (the first of his three years on the panel). Osbourne failed to win the show in her initial stint, but won on her return in series 10.

Contestants
 – Winner
 – Runner-Up

On four occasions, contestants have left the show under different circumstances than regular elimination. In series 4, Emily Nakanda withdrew from the show. In series 8, Frankie Cocozza was removed from the show after breaking a "golden rule" of the show. In the ninth series, Lucy Spraggan withdrew in week 5 of the live shows due to illness, after not performing in week 4, and not having had a full rehearsal session for week 5. Brooks Way withdrew from series 13 by mutual agreement after being absent from the first live show, due to events in the personal life of one of the band's members.
 Little Mix were originally known on the show as "Rhythmix" until they changed their name following pressure from a children's charity with the same name.
 In 2011, four contestants were eliminated from the show following the first live show by the judges, without facing a public vote, so should be listed as finishing joint 13th. However, following the removal of Cocozza 5 weeks later, the public were given the opportunity to vote for one of the four contestants to return. With 48% of votes cast, Amelia Lily was reinstated to the show. As a result, 2 Shoes, Jonjo Kerr, and James Michael are classed as joint 14th with Lily going on to finish in third place.

References

External links
 Official website

X Factor (British TV series) finalists, The